Boulton Peak is a peak at the southeast side of Curtiss Bay, about  south of Cape Andreas in Graham Land, Antarctica. It surmounts Pirin Glacier to the north and Gregory Glacier to the south.

It was mapped from air photos taken by Hunting Aerosurveys Ltd (1955–57), and named by the UK Antarctic Place-Names Committee for Matthew Piers Watt Boulton, the English inventor of ailerons for lateral control of aircraft, in 1868.

External links 
 Boulton Peak Copernix satellite image

References 

 Citations

 Bibliography 
 SCAR Composite Gazetteer of Antarctica.

Mountains of Graham Land
Danco Coast